In mechanical engineering, stressed skin is a type of rigid construction, intermediate between monocoque and a rigid frame with a non-loaded covering. A stressed skin structure has its compression-taking elements localized and its tension-taking elements distributed.  Typically, the main frame has rectangular structure and is triangulated by the covering.

Description 

A framework box can be distorted from being square, so it isn't rigid by itself, however adding diagonals that take either tension or compression fixes this, because the box cannot deviate from right angles without altering the diagonals.
Sometimes flexible members like wires are used to provide tension, or rigid compression frames are used, as with a Warren or Pratt truss, however both these are full frame structures.
When the skin or outer covering is in tension so that it provides a significant portion of the rigidity, the structure is said to have a stressed skin design. This may also be referred to as semi-monocoque, and overlaps with monocoque, which has less framing, sometimes only including longitudinal or lateral members, and also overlaps with rigid frame structures where a minor portion of the overall stiffness may be derived from the skin. This method of construction is lighter than a full frame structure and not as complex to design as a full monocoque.

Examples 
Examples include nearly all modern all-metal airplanes, as well as some railway vehicles, buses and motorhomes. The London Transport AEC Routemaster incorporated internal panels riveted to the frames which took most of the structure's shear load. Automobile unibodies are a form of stressed skin as well, as are some framed buildings which lack diagonal bracing.
 Dornier-Zeppelin D.I : first all-metal stressed skin fighter and first with stressed skin wings (1918)
 Short Silver Streak : first all-metal  British stressed skin aircraft (1920)
 Zeppelin-Lindau (Dornier) Rs.IV : first aircraft with an all-metal stressed skin fuselage to fly (1918)
 Zeppelin-Staaken E-4/20 : first all-metal stressed skin four-engine airliner (1919)
 Northrop Alpha : first American all-metal stressed skin aircraft
 GM New Look bus : stressed-skin bus, over 44,000 built since 1959, and many still in service

References

Notes

External links 
 Stressed Skin
 Wood to Metal: The Structural Origins of the Modern Airplane

Automotive technologies
Aircraft skin
Structural engineering